Uncle Sam is a 1996 American black comedy slasher film directed by William Lustig, written by Larry Cohen, and starring Isaac Hayes.

Plot 
In Kuwait, a military unit uncovers an American helicopter that was downed by friendly fire. As the wreckage is inspected, Master Sergeant Sam Harper, one of the burnt bodies within, springs to life and kills a sergeant and a major. He finally dies after muttering, "Don't be afraid, it's only friendly fire!"

Sam's body is eventually delivered to his hometown of Twin Rivers, which is preparing for Independence Day. Sam's wife Louise is given custody of the casket containing Sam's remains, which are left in the home of Sam's estranged sister Sally, who lives with her patriotic young son, Jody. Sam reanimates as a revenant in the early hours of the Fourth of July, and proceeds to kill and steal the costume of a perverted Uncle Sam. Sam then makes his way to a cemetery, where he murders two of three juvenile delinquents who had vandalized tombstones, and desecrated an American flag.

During the Independence Day celebration, in which corrupt congressman Alvin Cummings is visiting, Sam beheads the third delinquent, kills Jody's teacher (who opposed the Vietnam War) with a hatchet, and shoots Sally's unscrupulous lawyer boyfriend Ralph in the head. Despite these deaths, the festivities continue, but are thrown into disarray when Sam uses the fireworks gear to blow up congressman Cummings, and impales Louise’s deputy boyfriend Phil with an American Flag. As this occurs, Jody is told by his mother and aunt that Sam, his ostensibly heroic idol, was in fact an alcoholic psychopath who physically and sexually abused them, and only joined the military so he could get a "free pass" to kill people.

Jody is told by Barry, a blind boy who has established a mental link with Sam, that the undead Sam is responsible for the deaths. With help from Sam's old mentor Jed, the boys go to Jody's house, where they find the lecherous sergeant Twinning, who dropped Sam off, dead and stuffed inside Sam's coffin. Realizing that Sam will probably go after Louise, the boys and Jed go to her home, where Sam confronts and blames Jed, who told him tales of how glorious combat was, for his current state. Jed retorts by yelling that Sam only killed for the sake of killing rather than for his country.

Jed's gun proves ineffective against Sam, so he and Louise go to get Jed's cannon while Jody, who Sam claims is the reason he came back, keeps Sam occupied. Jody lures Sam outside, and Jed blasts him with the cannon, destroying him and Louise's house in flames. The next day, Sally watches as Jody burns all of his war-themed toys after learning the truth about Sam.

Cast

Reception 
Dread Central called Uncle Sam a "way underrated slasher flick," that "does a fine job of bringing the pain while we celebrate our independence," even though it "kind of plods along" and "none of it really makes too much sense."

A review by DVD Verdict described the film as "a sluggish, shoddily produced horror/comedy," that was "a by-the-numbers turd that sports embarrassing child actors, C-level stars slumming for a paycheck (oh P.J. Soles, how far you've tumbled...) and a level of suspense that rivals clipping your toenails in a well lit room." Uncle Sam was also derided by The A.V. Club, whose reviewer wrote "Incoherent as social satire and perfunctory and routine as a horror film, Uncle Sam is every bit as lazy and uninspired as the Maniac Cop films that preceded it."

References

External links 
 

1996 films
1996 horror films
1996 direct-to-video films
American black comedy films
American comedy horror films
American independent films
American slasher films
Anti-war films
Direct-to-video horror films
Films about domestic violence
Films directed by William Lustig
Films set in New Jersey
Films set in Kuwait
Films shot in California
Gulf War films
Incest in film
Independence Day (United States) films
American supernatural horror films
Holiday horror films
1990s political films
1990s war films
Films with screenplays by Larry Cohen
1990s English-language films
1990s American films